Legesse Wolde-Yohannes is an Ethiopian horticultural scientist. He cooperated with Aklilu Lemma on the discovery and research on how to use the plant endod as a means of preventing the parasitic disease bilharzia. He was awarded the Right Livelihood Award in 1989, jointly with Lemma.

References

:am:ለገሠ ወልደዮሓንስ#.E1.8B.A8.E1.8B.8D.E1.8C.AD .E1.88.98.E1.8B.AB.E1.8B.AB.E1.8B.A3.E1.8B.8E.E1.89.BD

Year of birth missing (living people)
Living people
Ethiopian scientists
Horticulturists